Buaraba South is a locality in the Lockyer Valley Region, Queensland, Australia. In , Buaraba South had no population.

History 
The district was named and bounded on 18 February 2000.

Education
There are no schools in Buaraba South. The nearest primary schools are in Murphys Creek, Lake Clarendon and Helidon. The nearest secondary school is Lockyer District State High School in Gatton.

References 

Lockyer Valley Region
Localities in Queensland